The following is an incomplete list of sports stadiums in North America, including Central America and the Caribbean. They are ordered by their seating capacity, that is the maximum number of seated spectators the stadium can accommodate.

Currently all North American stadiums with a capacity of 30,000 or more are included.

Most large stadiums in North America are used for American football, with the rest used for association football, baseball, Canadian football, and one each for bullfighting and cricket.

List

Canada below 30,000 capacity

Canada below 30,000 capacity indoor stadiums

Central America and the Caribbean below 30,000 capacity

Central America and the Caribbean below 30,000 capacity indoor stadiums

Mexico below 30,000 capacity

Mexico below 30,000 capacity indoor stadiums

United States below 30,000 capacity

United States below 30,000 college-owned indoor stadiums

United States below 30,000 municipal and privately-owned indoor stadiums

See also

Lists of stadiums by continent

List of African stadiums by capacity
List of Asian stadiums by capacity
List of European stadiums by capacity
List of Oceanian stadiums by capacity
List of South American stadiums by capacity

Lists of stadiums worldwide

 List of association football stadiums by capacity
 List of association football stadiums by country
 List of athletics stadiums
 List of baseball stadiums by capacity
 List of basketball arenas
 List of bullrings by capacity
 List of closed stadiums by capacity
 List of covered stadiums by capacity
 List of cricket grounds by capacity
 List of future stadiums
 List of indoor arenas
 List of indoor arenas by capacity
 List of rugby league stadiums by capacity
 List of rugby union stadiums by capacity
 List of sporting venues with a highest attendance of 100,000 or more
 List of sports venues by capacity
 List of stadiums by capacity
 List of tennis stadiums by capacity

Lists of stadiums by North American country

List of stadiums in the Bahamas
List of stadiums in Barbados
List of indoor arenas in Canada
List of stadiums in Canada
List of football stadiums in Costa Rica
List of baseball stadiums in Cuba
List of stadiums in the Dominican Republic
List of football stadiums in El Salvador
List of football stadiums in Guatemala
List of football stadiums in Haiti
List of football stadiums in Honduras
List of football stadiums in Mexico
List of indoor arenas in Mexico
List of stadiums in Mexico
List of football stadiums in Panama
List of stadiums in St. Lucia
List of football stadiums in St. Vincent and the Grenadines
List of football stadiums in Trinidad and Tobago
List of American football stadiums in the United States by capacity
List of baseball stadiums in the United States by capacity
List of indoor arenas in the United States
List of soccer stadiums in the United States
List of stadiums in the United States by capacity

Other

List of stadiums in Central America and the Caribbean
List of stadiums in North America
List of attendance figures at domestic professional sports leagues
List of professional sports leagues by revenue

References

Stadiums by capacity
Lists of stadiums
Lists of sports venues with capacity
Stadiums by capacity
Stadiums by capacity